London Irish is a British sitcom that debuted in 2013 on Channel 4. It follows the antics of Conor, Bronagh, Packy and Niamh, four twenty-something Belfast expatriates living in London.

Main cast
 Peter Campion as Patrick "Packy" Kennedy
 Sinéad Keenan as Bronagh Lynch
 Kerr Logan as Conor Lynch
 Kat Reagan as Niamh Rafferty
 Ardal O'Hanlon as Chris "Da" Lynch
 Tracey Lynch as "Ma" Lynch

Episode list

Episode 1

Packy bumps into Ryan, an old friend from home; a lovely polite fella whose hand got shot off during a hold-up at a garage where he worked with Packy, while covering Packy's shift.
Still feeling guilty about it, Packy decides to donate the proceeds of the pub quiz to Ryan's cause. And, of course, you'd think a good deed would lead to good things...

Episode 2

It's the morning after the night before... a wedding party. Bronagh wakes up wearing the bride's wedding dress, while Packy wakes up next to his crazy ex-girlfriend Steph.
Conor did something bad, but he can't for the life of him remember what. And when the gang hear that Dermot (a man they all hated) has died, Packy is determined to attend his wake because he's got his eye on the grieving girlfriend.

Episode 3

It's Halloween and there's a party to go to. Niamh can barely contain her excitement as she has been making costumes based on The Wizard of Oz for all of them.
Bronagh is in a foul mood because she's on a course of antibiotics and can't drink, plus her Ma and Da have sent their depressed, boring cousin Sean to London to help him get over his recent marital breakdown.

Episode 4

Conor pops out to get some fish and chips and returns seven days later with a Mexican woman, having been to Scotland and had a fight with Taggart.
Niamh has a new boyfriend, Martin, who won't compromise his devotion to God by having sex with her. But Niamh is determined to put that right, even if it means drastic action - or at least taking him to an art exhibition. Bronagh is desperate to attend Caoimhe Kavanagh's art exhibition too - especially since she hears that the former beauty and most popular girl from school is now fat.

Episode 5

It's the morning after St Patrick's Day and the gang wake up in a strange flat in East London. They have no idea how they got there or what happened last night, but half of Conor's Twix is missing, Packy's legs are hurting and the notorious Aoife McBride keeps calling him.

Episode 6

Bronagh and Packy experience what a nightmare families can be... Bronagh after a very long day with Conor and their Ma and Da attempting to experience all the excitement that London has to offer. Packy's brothers 'the twins' Matthew and Mark visit to ask for his help dealing with their younger brother Aidan who is now in London but seems to be spiralling out of control - most worryingly of all, he's started to wear an England football shirt.

International broadcasters
In Australia, the series premiered on 12 April 2015 on BBC First.

See also

 Derry Girls
 Can't Cope, Won't Cope

References

External links
 
Channel 4 episode guide

2013 British television series debuts
Channel 4 sitcoms
English-language television shows
Television shows set in London
2013 British television series endings